The Odder Line, also known formerly as the Hads-Ning Herreders Jernbane (HHJ), is a  long standard-gauge single-track light-rail line which connects the city of Aarhus to the town of Odder in the Central Denmark Region. The Odder Line has its own route between Rosenhøj and Odder, and parallels the mainline between Rosenhøj and Aarhus.

The line, first opened in 1884, was originally operated by the HHJ, which merged with the Lemvigbane (VLTJ) in 2008 to form Midtjyske Jernbaner. From 2012 to 2016 services on the line were operated by DSB as part of Aarhus Nærbane (Aarhus Commuter Rail).

The line was rebuilt in 2016–2018 to convert it into an electrified Aarhus Letbane (Aarhus Light Rail) route, operated by Midttrafik, with new tram-trains entering service in August 2018.

See also
 List of railway lines in Denmark
 Rail transport in Denmark

References

External links
 
 Official website

1884 establishments in Denmark
Railway companies established in 1884
Railway lines in Denmark
Rail transport in the Central Denmark Region